Jessica Curry (born c. 1973) is an English composer, radio presenter and former co-head of the British video game development studio The Chinese Room. She won a BAFTA award in 2016 for her score for the video game Everybody's Gone to the Rapture.

Education
Curry earned B.A.(Hons) English Literature and Language at University College London, graduating in 1994. Four years later, she obtained a Postgraduate diploma in Screen Music at the National Film and Television School.

Career

When Dan Pinchbeck was developing his experimental video game Dear Esther he turned to his wife Curry to write a score. Thus Curry became the co-founder of The Chinese Room game studio.

Following the success of that game, The Chinese Room went on to develop Amnesia: A Machine for Pigs which Curry describes as her first "journey into interactivity" as her score had been "shoehorned" into Dear Esther.

While Amnesia was in production, The Chinese Room received an approach from Sony Computer Entertainment's Santa Monica Studio to develop an exclusive game for them. Everybody's Gone to the Rapture, which had originally been envisioned as a PC release, subsequently became a PlayStation 4 exclusive. Curry describes Rapture as "the first time I would say that I wrote a truly interactive score".

In October 2015 Curry announced via her blog on The Chinese Room's website that she was leaving her role with the studio. She stated that her decision was based on various factors including a degenerative condition, the stress that she felt from the studio's relationship with a commercial publisher and her treatment as a woman in the game industry.

In April 2016, Curry won a BAFTA at the 12th British Academy Games Awards for her music on Everybody's Gone to the Rapture.

After her departure from The Chinese Room, Curry embarked on various other projects including a collaboration with poet laureate Carol Ann Duffy which saw poems by Duffy performed to music by Curry and others at Durham Cathedral in July 2016 as part of a centenary remembrance of the Battle of the Somme.

In October 2016 Curry's score to Dear Esther was performed live by a full orchestra at London's Barbican Centre to coincide with the release of the game for the PS4 and Xbox One consoles.

In January 2017, it was announced that Curry would present High Score, Classic FM's six-episode series on video game music.  In October 2017 it was announced that Curry's show was renewed for another six episodes, starting 4 November.

Starting October 2019, Curry presented Sound of Gaming on BBC Radio 3, a weekly series on video game music.

Personal life

Curry and husband Dan Pinchbeck have been together since 2000. They are based in Brighton and have one son.

She is a fan of film director Peter Greenaway and his frequent collaborator, composer Michael Nyman.

Awards

BAFTA Awards

!
|-
| rowspan="2"|2016
| rowspan="2"|Everybody's Gone to the Rapture
| Best Audio
| 
| rowspan="3" style="text-align:center;"| 
|-
| Best Music
| 
|-
| 2013
| Dear Esther
| Best Audio
| 
|}

Works

References 

21st-century English composers
21st-century English women musicians
Alumni of the National Film and Television School
Alumni of University College London
British women composers
Musicians from Liverpool
Radio presenters from Liverpool
Video game composers
British radio presenters
British women radio presenters
1970s births
Year of birth uncertain
Living people
People from Brighton
21st-century women composers